Defending champion Chris Evert successfully defended her title, defeating Nancy Richey in the final, 6–3, 6–3 to win the singles tennis title at the 1973 Virginia Slims Championships.

Both the top two qualifying players, Margaret Court and Billie Jean King, withdrew from the tournament due to injury, although Court did compete (and win) in the doubles event. Fourth ranked Evonne Goolagong also defaulted.

Seeds

Draw

Draw

References

1973 WTA Tour
Singles